The Pirelli Cup was an annual friendly football tournament sponsored by the Pirelli Tyre company. The competition was started in 1996 as a single 90-minute friendly match between Pirelli-sponsored Internazionale and another invited team. Since 1996, 14 editions of the one-match tournament have been held. The latest edition of the competition was held in 2010 in Baltimore, featuring Inter Milan and Manchester City. The match ended 3–0 as Inter won the trophy.

Winners

List of finals

Titles by club

Participation by club
Below is the participation by club listed, grouped by country.

Top goalscorers

See also
TIM Trophy

References

Italian football friendly trophies
Inter Milan